House of Sand may refer to:

A House of Sand, a 1962 American film
The House of Sand, a 2005 Brazilian film
House of Sand, a 1986 novel by Barbara Rowan
"House of Sand", a song by Elvis Presley from Paradise, Hawaiian Style

See also
House of Sand and Fog (disambiguation)